Kandar may refer to:

Places 
 Iran
 Kandar-e Abdol Reza, Fars Province
 Kandar-e Kolah Boland, Fars Province
 Kandar-e Mohammadi, Fars Province
 Kandar-e Sheykh, Fars Province
 Kandar, Qazvin

 Pakistan
 Kandar, Pakistan, village in Khyber Pakhtunkhwa, Pakistan

 Tunisia
 Kandar, Tunisia

Other uses 
 Kandar (fish), a species of fish

See also
 Kandor (disambiguation)
 Kondar (disambiguation)
 Kondor (disambiguation)